Joseph James Tombura (12 September 1929 – 17 September 1992) a South Sudanese politician and member of the Sudan African National Union, was president of the High Executive Council of the Southern Sudan Autonomous Region, serving from 23 June 1982 to 5 June 1983, until the Sudanese central government revoked the autonomy of that region. Autonomy was restored in 2005, and six years later South Sudan became an independent nation.

References

Presidents of South Sudan
Zande people
1929 births
1992 deaths
Sudan African National Union politicians